The Costa de la Luz ("Coast of Light") is a section of the Andalusian coast in Spain facing the Atlantic. It extends from Tarifa in the south, along the coasts of the Province of Cádiz and the Province of Huelva, to the mouth of the Guadiana River.

A holiday destination for vacationing Spaniards, in recent years the Costa de la Luz has seen more foreign visitors, especially from France and Germany.  Increasing urbanization and tourism-oriented development of parts of the coast have had economic benefits.

Attractions and recreation 

Aside from the beaches and the sunshine, there are ample opportunities and facilities for leisure activities, like fine dining, golf, kitesurfing, boating, and other water sports. The Costa de la Luz has protected natural reserves and a number of natural attractions.  Among them are the Doñana National Park, where endangered species, such as the Spanish imperial eagle and the Iberian lynx (Felis pardina), can occasionally be sighted; the Bay of Cádiz; the steeply-pitched shorelines of the southern section of the Andalusian coastline; the salt marshes of Barbate and the seaside cliffs at La Breña (both within the La Breña y Marismas del Barbate Natural Park); and the wetlands at the mouths of the rivers Tinto and Odiel, where there is a profusion of water fowl and, in season, other migratory birds, including storks and flamingos.

A further facility of interest is the atmospheric research station El Arenosillo, where sometimes rockets are launched.

History 

The Costa de la Luz has a history that dates back to the twelfth century BCE. Cultural attractions include Baelo Claudia, the well-preserved ruins of a small Roman city; Cape Trafalgar, where, in 1805, in sight of this promontory, the English admiral, Horatio Nelson, defeated a combined French and Spanish fleet; and La Rábida Monastery.

At the Rábida Monastery in Palos de la Frontera near Huelva, Christopher Columbus sought the aid of the Franciscan brothers, hoping to enlist them as advocates for his scheme to launch a voyage of discovery.  They introduced Columbus to a wealthy local seafaring family, the Pinzón brothers, who eventually prevailed upon Ferdinand and Isabella to listen to Columbus's pitch for support.  With royal patronage and the collaboration of the Pinzóns, Columbus was able to secure his three ships as well as local crews from the Huelva area.

Climate
Köppen-Geiger climate classification system classifies its climate as hot-summer Mediterranean (Csa).

References

External links

 Official web Costa de la Luz Huelva 
 Official web Costa de la Luz Cadiz 
 Costa de la Luz Travel Guide
 Costa de la Luz Virtual Tour

 
Geography of the Province of Cádiz
De la Luz
Geography of the Province of Huelva
Tourism in Spain
Tourist attractions in Andalusia
Coasts of the Atlantic Ocean